Gustav Waldemar von Rauch (30 January 1819 in Berlin - 7 May 1890 in Berlin) was a general of the cavalry  in the Prussian Army. He was born and died in Berlin. He was the son of Gustav von Rauch.

External links 

1819 births
1890 deaths
Prussian generals
Military personnel from Berlin
Gustav Waldemar
Recipients of the Iron Cross (1870), 2nd class
Recipients of the Military Merit Cross (Mecklenburg-Schwerin), 1st class
Grand Crosses of the Order of the Dannebrog
Grand Crosses of the Order of Aviz
Recipients of the Order of St. Vladimir, 2nd class
Recipients of the Order of the White Eagle (Russia)